Mount Crabtree is a mountain  high,  east-southeast of Mount Fonda in the north-central part of the Swanson Mountains, in the Ford Ranges of Marie Byrd Land. It was mapped by the United States Antarctic Service (1939–41) under Rear Admiral Richard E. Byrd, and named for Dr. E. Granville Crabtree, a urologist who was a consultant in the preparation stages of "Operation Highjump II" (which was cancelled) and for Operation Deep Freeze I (1955–56), for which Admiral Byrd was Officer in Charge, U.S. Antarctic Programs.

References 

Mountains of Marie Byrd Land